Al-Mi'raj or Almiraj  is a mythical creature resembling a one-horned hare or rabbit, mentioned in medieval Arabic literature.

The name appears in a version of the legend of Iskandar  (Alexander the Great) who after defeating the dragon of Dragon Island in the Indian Ocean, obtained the animal as gift from the inhabitants. The creature is also said to cause all animals that sets sight on it to flee.

The creature also appears nameless, is given other variant names, or situated elsewhere, depending on the text or manuscript source.

Qazwini's account 

Al-miʿrāj is a beast purported to live on an island called  ('Sea-Serpent Island' or 'Dragon Island') in the Indian Ocean, according to Qazwini's Marvels of Things Created and Miraculous Aspects of Things Existing (c. 1260, aka The Wonders of Creation).

This beast is said to resemble a yellow hare (or rabbit) with a single black horn. All the wild beasts fled at the sight of it (which is a trait also shared by the karkadann, another unicorn of Arabic literature). The islanders made a gift of it to Iskandar (Alexander the Great) after he helped kill a dragon (or large serpent) which had been eating the livestock.

Manuscripts 

The hare has been drawn rather faithfully according to text e.g. in the Sarre manuscript (the relevant folio is now in the possession of Freer Gallery of Art), captioned "Dragon of Dragon Island and the Miraculous Hare").

The creature however is depicted rather like a "hybrid animal that looks more like a fierce hound" in the Berlin copy (Staatliche Museen, Islamische Abteilung, now Museum of Islamic Art, Berlin).

The Sarre manuscript and other copies of Qazwini's cosmography fail to mention any name for the horned hare. Michel Wiedemann, who provides a French translation that mentions no name for the hare, is of the opinion that the name didn't occur in the original text but was added by later copyists.

The oldest copy of Qazwini is the Munich manuscript, Bayerische Staatsbibliothek (BSB) Cod.Arab. 464, which carries a miniature painting of the dragon and the horned hare on folio 63 (pictured above). The dragon is depicted "devouring sulfur-filled bulls, which look like a red piece of meat".

Idrisi's account 
The horned hare is called ʿarāj , and the dragon-inhabited isle is called Mustashiayn situated in Western Africa in a recension of Idrisi's Nuzhat al-Mushtaq ("The Book of Pleasant Journeys into Faraway Lands", c. 1154),. Iskandar, here also called Dhu'l-Qarnayn "The Two-Horned",  vanquishes the dragon by the same means as in Qazwini's tale, namely, stuffing the two sacrificial oxen with active substances, and the outcome was that the bait "ignites fire inside the [monster's] entrails, and it expires".

Ibn al-Wardi's treatise 

The name of the wondrous beast was copied as al-Maharāǧ (al-Maharāj, sic.) in Ibn al-Wardī's Margarita mirabilum or Pearl of Wonders during the 14th century.

Miscellaneous 

There is a Turkish translation of Qazwini on illuminated manuscript (18th century, Walters Art Museum), and the episode of the dragon's isle and the horned hare is illustrated on one of its leaves (Fig. right).

Also, the Ottoman historian 's Qanun al-Dunya ("Law of the World"), preserved in manuscript (Topkapi Sarayi Museum Library ms. R 1638, fol. 15v), depicts the dragon and the golden one-horned hare.

Dragon-slaying variations 

Legend holds that Iskandar carried out his serpent/dragon-slaying using decoy oxen consisting of oxen-hide loaded with lethal material.

In Qazwini's cosmology, the reactive ingredients consisted of coniferous resin/turpentine{{Refn|group="lower-alpha"|Fichtenharz as given by Ethé is literally "spruce resin", but this is a general term for coniferous resins.}} (or pitch or tar), sulfur, quicklime, arsenic, and iron hooks, or just sulfur and iron hooks, depending on the recension.

 Persian version 
As for treatments in languages other than Arabic, it is pointed out that the dragon-slaying Iskandar of Qazwini can be identified with one of the shahs of the  Persian epic Shahnāma, or "The Book of Kings".

In the Shahnāma version, Iskandar/Sekandar/Sikandar employs five oxen filled with poison and oil ("bane and naphtha") which are inflated, in order to defeat his dragon.

 Old Syriac version 
The immediate source of this legend circulating in the Islamic world seems to be the 7th century Syriac version of the Alexander Romance (pseudo-Callisthenes). Here, Aleksandros after several days orders two large sacrificial oxen be removed of flesh, and had them stuffed with gypsum, pitch, lead, and sulfur to feed to the dragon. When it was incapacitated, heated balls of brass be cast into its mouth by Alexander's orders, upon which the monster finally died. The episode is only found in the Syriac version, but is conjectured to have been present in the hypothetical Greek original (*δ variant).

 Turkish version 
And in Ahmedî's poem,  uses hooks in his stratagem to destroy a dragon: namely, he attached a thousand poisoned hooks to his ox-driven chariot, and having administered himself with the antidote, he assaulted the dragon. The dragon consequently received fatal injuries around its mouth and on its head. Incidentally, this tactic is paralleled in the Shahnāma for a different king, Isfandiyar who used a horse-drawn chariot spiked with swords to combat a dragon.

Pop culture references
Al-Mi'raj has been occasionally featured in video and role-playing games.

 Al-Mi'raj has been adapted into Dungeons & Dragons, as part of the 1st edition Advanced Dungeons and Dragons Fiend Folio.
 An enemy in the Dragon Quest series (アルミラージ ... arumirāji), first appearing in Dragon Quest III, where it is a low-level monster with a sleep attack used to render players helpless while it attacks. In U.S. localizations it has usually been renamed to "Spiked Hare", but its name is preserved in the Game Boy Color version  Unlike the normal legendary Miraj, this Mi'raj is purple with a white horn and white cheeks.
 In Episode 10 of the anime Is It Wrong to Try to Pick Up Girls in a Dungeon? the first floor of the mid level contains multiple white rabbits that walk on two legs and which are identified as al-mi'raj.
 In the animated short "Red" (2010), the little wolf-boy protects Red from an al-mi'raj that can grow to a monstrous size.
 The Yu-Gi-Oh! Breakers of Shadow booster pack features a card based on this mythical creature called Al-Lumi'raj, and the Battles of Legend: Hero's Revenge pack features another called Salamangreat Almiraj.
 The game Rage of Bahamut (and subsequently the Shadowverse CCG, which is based on it) contains a character called Moon Al-Mir'aj, a humanoid rabbit with a black horn called Ramina.
 In the Donald Duck story "Mythological Menagerie", Donald tries to fool Huey, Dewey and Louie by painting a rabbit yellow and attaching a horn to it, but the nephews identify it as a Mi'Raj.
 In Brave Frontier, Al-mi'raj is a common light-element unit, depicted as a white rabbit with tufts of blue fur and a golden horn.
In the episode 10 of I've Been Killing Slimes for 300 Years and Maxed Out My Level, a musician bunny girl appears, introduces herself as Kuku from Al-Mi'raj race. 
 In the episode 8 of Re:Zero − Starting Life in Another World'' season 2, multiple al-mi'raj appear in a vast and snowy plain as Subaru is standing in the middle of them.

See also 
Golden Fleece
Jackalope
Lepus cornutus
Shadhavar
Shope papilloma virus
Wolpertinger

Explanatory notes

References 

Bibliography

 
 
  
 

Arabian mythology
Arabian legendary creatures
Asian witchcraft
Mythological rabbits and hares
Unicorns